Gordon Muriel Flowerdew  (2 January 1885 – 31 March 1918) was an English-born Canadian recipient of the Victoria Cross, the highest and most prestigious award for gallantry in the face of the enemy that can be awarded to British and Commonwealth forces, received for his actions at the Battle of Moreuil Wood.

Early life
He was born in Billingford, Norfolk, one of fourteen children, and was educated at Framlingham College in Suffolk, as were all nine of his brothers. At the age of 18, after a bout of pleurisy, he emigrated to British Columbia, where he took up ranching, settling in Walhachin, a community known locally as "little England".

Military career
When the war broke out in September 1914, he enlisted as a private in Lord Strathcona's Horse. He rose quickly through the ranks and was commissioned as an officer in 1916.  In January 1918 Flowerdew was given command of C Squadron of Lord Strathcona's Horse.

For most of the war, the Canadian Cavalry Brigade was not involved in much direct fighting, because of the static nature of the warfare.  However, when the Germans launched Operation Michael and began a rapid advance in the spring of 1918, cavalry again became an important factor. In late March, as the Germans approached Moreuil and threatened to cross the L'Avre River, the last natural barrier before Amiens, the Canadian Cavalry Corps was assigned the task of stopping them. As the Germans began to enter Moreuil Wood from the east, Lieutenant Flowerdew's squadron rode around the wood and approached the Germans' flank from the north.  Flowerdew's commanding officer, Brigadier Jack Seely, had ordered a cavalry charge.

Riding into the fire of five infantry companies and an artillery battery, the squadron suffered atrocious casualties (more than half of the men in C Squadron were killed), and Flowerdew himself was fatally wounded. However, the cavalry charge so unnerved the Germans that they were never able to capture Moreuil Wood, and their advance turned into a retreat in early April. His actions in "The Last Great Cavalry Charge" led to the award of the Victoria Cross. Flowerdew lived long enough to be made aware of the success of the charge. Seely wrote to his sister, referring to "when your brave young brother met his death at the moment of victory to which he had contributed the largest share".

Citation

Flowerdew's Victoria Cross was one of twenty awarded during the battles of the German and Allied offensives in the Amiens area in 1918.

Alfred Munnings, who was then a largely unknown war artist, created an oil painting Charge of Flowerdew's Squadron which depicts this cavalry charge. The canvas was formerly at the Imperial War Museum in London; it is now in the collection of the Canadian War Museum in Ottawa.

Flowerdew is buried at Namps-au-Val Cemetery in France located 11 miles south-east of Amiens (plot I, row H. grave 1).

Legacy
His posthumously awarded Victoria Cross was donated by his mother to Framlingham College in England. It had been on loan to, and displayed by, Lord Strathcona's Horse (Royal Canadians) at their gallery in The Military Museums in Calgary, Alberta, from 1990 to 2002. The medal was returned to the college in 2002, returning to be displayed on the 2018 Moreuil Wood Military Parade and commemoration.

Lieutenant Flowerdew is a character in the play Mary's Wedding, by Canadian playwright Stephen Massicotte.  The climax of the play takes place during the charge at Moreuil Wood.

See also
 Horses in World War I

References

Further reading 
Monuments to Courage (David Harvey, 1999)
The Register of the Victoria Cross (This England, 1997)
VCs of the First World War - Spring Offensive 1918 (Gerald Gliddon, 1997)

External links
 Gordon Flowerdew's digitized service file
 Gordon Flowerdew, a featured article on Duty & Valour
 Biography at the Dictionary of Canadian Biography Online
 
 Royal Alberta Museum:  "Strathcona's Horse: A Western Heritage" (2000)
 Canadian Great War Project
 

Burials in France
Canadian World War I recipients of the Victoria Cross
People from Billingford, Breckland
1885 births
Canadian military personnel killed in World War I
1918 deaths
People from British Columbia
People educated at Framlingham College
Canadian Expeditionary Force officers
British emigrants to Canada
Military personnel from Norfolk
Lord Strathcona's Horse officers
Lord Strathcona's Horse (Royal Canadians)